William Prager, (before 1940) Willy Prager, (May 23, 1903 in Karlsruhe – March 17, 1980 in Zurich) was a German-born US applied mathematician. In the field of mechanics he is well known for the Drucker–Prager yield criterion.

Willy Prager studied civil engineering at the Technische Universität Darmstadt and received his diploma in 1925. He received his doctorate in 1926 and worked as a research assistant in the field of mechanics from 1925 to 1929. From 1927 to 1929 he habilitated. He was a deputy director at University of Göttingen, professor at Karlsruhe, University of Istanbul, the University of California, San Diego and Brown University, where he advised Bernard Budiansky. Prager was also on a sabbatical at IBM's research lab in Zurich.

The Society of Engineering Science has awarded the William Prager Medal in Solid Mechanics since 1983 in his honor. In 1957, he received a Guggenheim Fellowship.

Works 
Beitrag zur Kinematik des Raumfachwerks, 1926, dissertation
 "Dynamik der Stabwerke" (with K. Hohenemser), 1933
 "Mechanique des solides isotropes", 1937
 
 Prager, William (1961).  Introduction to Mechanics of Continua.  Ginn and Company.

External links 
 William Prager - Encyclopedia Brunoniana - Brown University
 References for William Prager
 Mac Tutor Bio for William Prager

See also
Plastic limit theorems

References

1903 births
1980 deaths
20th-century German mathematicians
20th-century American mathematicians
German emigrants to the United States
Academic staff of Istanbul University
Members of the United States National Academy of Sciences
Academic staff of Technische Universität Darmstadt
Technische Universität Darmstadt alumni